Ryan Green (born 20 October 1980) is a Welsh footballer who plays as a Defender. He earned two international caps for Wales in 1998, breaking Ryan Giggs's record as their youngest player, a record which has since been surpassed.

Club career

Wolverhampton Wanderers
Green began his career as a trainee with Wolverhampton Wanderers turning professional in October 1997. Despite already being a full international, manager Mark McGhee kept him in the reserves. His successor Colin Lee needed a replacement for defender Kevin Muscat on 10 November 1998 and gave Green his debut in a 2–1 First Division victory against Sheffield United at Molineux. He was praised by local newspaper Express & Star for his performance, and was given an ovation when he was substituted due to injury. During his recuperation, Muscat recovered and regained his place in the team.

Green handed in a transfer request in January 2000, when he was not chosen for an FA Cup game against Sheffield Wednesday, and Lee stated that his preferred right backs were Muscat and Darren Bazeley. However, at the start of the 2000–01 season, Bazeley was moved into right midfield and Muscat to left back, giving Green an extended run in the team. On 17 October, away to West Bromwich Albion in the Black Country derby, he was sent off in the 40th minute of a 1–0 loss, for two fouls on Jason Roberts in a three-minute space. He never started for the team again, and totalled eight starts and four substitute appearances in his time at the club.

In early 2001, Green handed in another transfer request, and joined Torquay United on loan in March, where Lee was assistant manager. He played ten times as they successfully fought off relegation to the Conference, despite scoring an own goal in the final game of the season, a 3–2 win away to Barnet which relegated the hosts.

Millwall and Sheffield Wednesday
Green moved to fellow First Division side Millwall on a free transfer on 20 October 2001, until the end of the season, signed by his former Wolves manager McGhee. He made his debut later that day in a 3–3 draw against Nottingham Forest at The New Den.

He almost joined Bradford City in 2002, a move scuppered by the financial impact on Football League clubs of the ITV Digital collapse. Instead he joined Cardiff City on a monthly contract in November 2002, joining Sheffield Wednesday two weeks later. He was released by Wednesday at the end of the season, having been relegated to the Second Division.

Hereford United
In August 2003, Green signed for Conference side Hereford United. On 23 September, against Telford United at Edgar Street, he scored his first senior goal, a left-foot volley to seal a 2–1 win in the third minute of added time and keep the Bulls in first place in the league. On 13 December, he was sent off in the last minute of a 0–1 home loss to Tamworth. The team finished the season in the play-off places, where they were eliminated in the semi-finals by Aldershot.

Green played 26 league games in the 2004–05 season, scoring his only goal of the campaign on 30 August in a 4–1 win at Northwich Victoria. Hereford again reached the play-off semi-finals, losing 2–1 on aggregate to Stevenage Borough.

He opened his third season at the club on 13 August 2005, scoring the third goal of a 4–0 home win over Scarborough. Sixteen days later, in a 1–0 win at Tamworth, he was sent off for violent conduct. For a third successive season, Hereford made the play-offs, and dispatched Morecambe in the semi-finals to set up a final against Halifax Town on 20 May 2006. In the decisive game, at Leicester City's Walkers Stadium, he scored the 108th-minute winner in a 3–2 victory.

Bristol Rovers
On 31 May 2006, Green signed a two-year contract with Bristol Rovers of League Two. He made his debut on 5 August, replacing Chris Carruthers for the final 15 minutes of a 2–1 loss at Peterborough United. Green made 33 league appearances in his first season with the Pirates but suffered a foot injury in the 4–3 away defeat to Grimsby Town on 20 February 2007. Due to the injury, he missed the Football League Trophy final, which his team lost to Doncaster Rovers. He returned for the final stages of the campaign as they qualified for the play-offs. After eliminating Lincoln 7–4 on aggregate in the semi-finals, he played in the final on 26 May at Wembley Stadium, a 3–1 win over Shrewsbury Town.

A broken jaw and further Achilles tendon problems in a volatile match at Swindon Town ruled him out for the rest of the following season. A hamstring injury sustained in a pre-season friendly added to Green's injury nightmare. His contract was not renewed, and he left the club on 8 May 2009.

Return to Hereford United
On 5 June 2009, Green re-signed for Hereford United on a one-year deal for the 2009–10 season. Following their relegation in 2012, Hereford did not offer him a new contract.

Later career
In August 2012, Green joined Welsh Premier League club Port Talbot Town.

In June 2014 he joined Merthyr Town, whom he captained to victory in the Southern Football League South & West.

On 14 September 2015 he signed for Hereford, the phoenix club of Hereford United, in the Midland Football League Premier Division. Following a successful season which resulted in promotion, Green signed for another season at Hereford in July 2016.

On 11 July 2019, Green joined Westfields FC.

International career
Cardiff-born Green made his full international debut against Malta on 3 June 1998, before playing a senior club game. At the age of 17 years and 226 days, he became their youngest international, eclipsing the record of Ryan Giggs. Wales manager Bobby Gould went on to select him for a match against Tunisia, his second and final cap. Giggs himself called the selection of Green a "typical Gould stunt", and wrote in his autobiography that he and Green only had a hometown in common.

Green's record stood until it was surpassed by Lewin Nyatanga in 2004, aged 17 years and 195 days. After being occupied by Gareth Bale, it is currently held by Harry Wilson, who was 16 years and 207 days old on his 2013 debut.

Honours
Hereford United
Conference National play-off: 2006

Bristol Rovers
Football League Trophy: 2006–07 Runner-up
Football League Two play-off: 2007

Merthyr Town
Southern Football League South & West: 2014–15

Hereford
Midland Football League Premier Division: 2015–2016
Midland Football League League Cup: 2015–2016
FA Vase: 2015–16 Runner-up
Herefordshire FA County Cup: 2015–2016
Southern Football League South & West: 2016–17

References

External links
Ryan Green player profile at bristolrovers.co.uk
Ryan Green player profile at wolves.co.uk

1980 births
Footballers from Cardiff
Living people
Association football fullbacks
Welsh footballers
Wales youth international footballers
Wales under-21 international footballers
Wales international footballers
Wolverhampton Wanderers F.C. players
Torquay United F.C. players
Millwall F.C. players
Cardiff City F.C. players
Sheffield Wednesday F.C. players
Hereford United F.C. players
Bristol Rovers F.C. players
English Football League players
Port Talbot Town F.C. players
Merthyr Town F.C. players
Hereford F.C. players
Sutton United F.C. players
Westfields F.C. players
Cymru Premier players
Hereford F.C. managers